St. Marys Historic District was listed on the National Register of Historic Places on May 13, 1976 and is located in St. Marys, Georgia. The city was first settled in the mid-16th century by the Spanish.

Historical significance
The St. Marys historic district is roughly bounded by Waterfront Rd., Norris
Alexander, and Oak Grove Cemetery. It contains portions of the original 18th-century town containing
residential, commercial, and religious buildings dating from the late 18th-early 20th century. Notable
features include the waterfront area, the early cemetery, a bell cast by Paul and Joseph Warren Revere,
and a memorial oak planted the day of George Washington's burial.  Established by an act of the state legislature on December 5, 1792, and was incorporated in November 1802. It served as Camden County Georgia's seat of government from 1869 until 1923.  Orange Hall is a contributing property and is also on the NRHP individually.
The St. Marys United Methodist Church was founded in 1799.  It is considered to be the father of Florida's Methodist Churches.

Gallery of photos

See also
St. Marys, Georgia
Cumberland Island
National Register of Historic Places listings in Camden County, Georgia

References

External links
St Marys Downtown Development Authority
St. Marys Convention and Visitors Bureau
Georgia's Coast in photographs and more

External links

Historic districts on the National Register of Historic Places in Georgia (U.S. state)
Geography of Camden County, Georgia
Populated places established in 1792
National Register of Historic Places in Camden County, Georgia